Aflam TV is a Moroccan public national television movie channel. It is a part of the state-owned SNRT Group along with Al Aoula, Arryadia, Athaqafia, Al Maghribia, Assadissa, Tamazight TV and Laayoune TV. The channel was launched on 31 May 2008. It is broadcasting via DVB-T only.

References

External links

Aflam TV at LyngSat Address

Television stations in Morocco
Television channels and stations established in 2008
2008 establishments in Morocco
Société Nationale de Radiodiffusion et de Télévision